The red-throated cool-skink or red-throated skink (Acritoscincus platynotus) is a species of skink, a lizard in the family Scincidae. The species is endemic to Australia.

References

Skinks of Australia
Reptiles described in 1881
Acritoscincus
Taxa named by Wilhelm Peters